Odile Tailleu (27 March 1898 – 11 May 1979) was a Belgian racing cyclist. He rode in the 1926, 1927, 1928 and 1930 Tour de France.

References

External links
 

1898 births
1979 deaths
Belgian male cyclists
Place of birth missing